Dhani is a pentatonic raga in Hindustani classical music. It is a sprightly raga often described as Bhimpalasi sans the notes, Dha and Re. It however has its own distinct character. Dhani is frequently heard in popular music. This raga is also known as the romantic version of Raag Malkauns. It is similar to Malkauns, except that in the Aaroh and Avroh, Komal Dha is replaced by Pa in this raga

Popular Compositions (Bandishes) 
Hey Manwa Tum Na Jane by Pt C R Vyas is a popular Bandish in this raag.

South Film songs (Tamil, Telugu, Malayalam, Kannada) 
Note that the following songs are composed in Suddha Dhanyasi, the equivalent of raga Dhani in Carnatic music.

Language: Tamil

Non Film / Album

Language: Malayalam

Language: Kannada

Language: Telugu

References 

Hindustani ragas